The 1989 Masters Tournament was the 53rd Masters Tournament, held April 6–9 at Augusta National Golf Club in Augusta, Georgia.

Nick Faldo won the first of his three Masters titles, the second of his six major championships. After a third round 77 (+5), he shot a final round 65 (−7) and won with a birdie on the second hole of a sudden-death playoff with Scott Hoch. The 1989 Masters is remembered for Hoch missing a  putt on the first playoff hole that would have won him the green jacket. Greg Norman continued his misfortunes at the Masters with a bogey on the 72nd hole to miss a playoff by a stroke, similar to 1986. Third round leader Ben Crenshaw also bogeyed the final hole to tie Norman for third.

Faldo became the first man from England to win the Masters and was the second consecutive winner from the United Kingdom. Defending champion Sandy Lyle of Scotland missed the cut by two strokes, but made history at the champions' dinner on Tuesday by sporting a kilt and serving haggis.

Field
1. Masters champions
Tommy Aaron, George Archer, Seve Ballesteros (3,9,12), Gay Brewer, Billy Casper, Charles Coody, Ben Crenshaw (9,10,13,14), Raymond Floyd (2,9), Doug Ford, Bernhard Langer (9), Sandy Lyle (3,13), Larry Mize (10,14), Jack Nicklaus (9), Arnold Palmer, Gary Player, Craig Stadler (9), Tom Watson (3,9), Fuzzy Zoeller (2,9,10)

Jack Burke Jr., Bob Goalby, Claude Harmon, Ben Hogan, Herman Keiser, Cary Middlecoff, Byron Nelson, Henry Picard, Gene Sarazen, Sam Snead, and Art Wall Jr. did not play.

2. U.S. Open champions (last five years)
Andy North, Scott Simpson (10,14), Curtis Strange (9,12,13,14)

3. The Open champions (last five years)
Nick Faldo (10,11), Greg Norman (9,12,13)

4. PGA champions (last five years)
Hubert Green (9), Larry Nelson (12,13,14), Jeff Sluman (12,13), Lee Trevino, Bob Tway (13)

5. U.S. Amateur champion and runner-up
Eric Meeks (a), Danny Yates (a)

6. The Amateur champion
Christian Hardin (a)

7. U.S. Amateur Public Links champion
Ralph Howe III (a)

8. U.S. Mid-Amateur champion
David Eger (a)

9. Top 24 players and ties from the 1988 Masters Tournament
Chip Beck (12,13), Mark Calcavecchia (12,13,14), Chen Tze-chung, Fred Couples (10,13), David Frost (12,13), Mark McCumber (13), Mark McNulty, Dan Pohl (10,11,13,14), Don Pooley, Nick Price, Doug Tewell, Lanny Wadkins (10,12,13,14)

10. Top 16 players and ties from the 1988 U.S. Open
Paul Azinger (11,13), Andy Bean (14), Bob Gilder (11), Mark O'Meara (12,13), Steve Pate (13), Payne Stewart (13,14), D. A. Weibring

11. Top eight players and ties from 1988 PGA Championship
Tom Kite (12,13,14), Tsuneyuki Nakajima, Dave Rummells

12. Winners of PGA Tour events since the previous Masters
Jim Benepe, Mark Brooks, Bill Glasson (13), Ken Green (13), Morris Hatalsky, Steve Jones, Gary Koch (13), Bruce Lietzke (13), Bob Lohr, Andrew Magee, Blaine McCallister, Jodie Mudd (13), Corey Pavin, Tom Purtzer, Mike Reid (13), Gene Sauers, Tom Sieckmann, Tim Simpson, Joey Sindelar (13), Mike Sullivan, Greg Twiggs, Scott Verplank

Phil Blackmar, the winner of the Provident Classic was not invited.

13. Top 30 players from the 1988 PGA Tour money list
Jay Haas, Scott Hoch, Peter Jacobsen, Mark Wiebe

14. Members of the U.S. 1987 Ryder Cup team
Hal Sutton

15. Special foreign invitation
José María Olazábal, Masashi Ozaki, Ian Woosnam

Round summaries

First round 
Thursday, April 6, 1989

Lee Trevino, vying for an elusive Masters title, shot an opening round 67 to lead Nick Faldo by one shot. Only 10 players broke par on day one, including 1984 champion Ben Crenshaw and 1980 and 1983 champion Seve Ballesteros. Defending champion Sandy Lyle birdied 18 to shoot a disappointing 77.

Second round 
Friday, April 7, 1989

Lee Trevino and Nick Faldo, who both shot over par on the day, shared the lead after a difficult scoring day. Only four players broke par including Ken Green, who shot 69 and had the round of the day. Seve Ballesteros shot 72 even though he had a 4 putt on the 15th hole.

Amateurs: Howe III (+12), Yates (+14), Eger (+18), Meeks (+18), Hardin (+26)

Third round 
Saturday, April 8, 1989

Saturday was a long day that included a 90 minute delay and eventual suspension of play. Ben Crenshaw stormed to a four-shot lead at the suspension of play. Crenshaw was 3-under on the day through 13. Nick Faldo got off to a slow start with a double bogey on the first hole. On the second hole, he holed an improbable  birdie putt, but was 3 over on the day through 12 holes. Out early, clubhouse leader Greg Norman posted a 68 to reach +1 and close within five shots of the lead when play was suspended. Lee Trevino, trying to complete the career Grand Slam, faded out of contention Saturday.

Sunday, April 9, 1989

For the first time since 1984, the third round was completed on Sunday morning. Conditions were ideal, but overnight leader Ben Crenshaw was unable to take advantage as his four-shot morning lead was cut to one by the end of the third round. Seve Ballesteros who was +3 at the suspension of play on Saturday birdied 14, 15, and 17 to get back to level par. Nick Faldo continued to struggle in the morning, playing his last six holes in two over par, to fall 5 shots out of the lead at the end of the third round. First and second round leader Lee Trevino couldn't get any momentum in the morning and stumbled to an  81.

Final round 
Sunday, April 9, 1989

Summary
An exciting final round had six different players hold at least a share of the lead on the back nine. Nick Faldo, five shots back to start the round, birdied four of his first seven holes to post 32 on the front nine. Faldo continued his comeback with miraculous birdies on 16 and 17 to post 65 and hold the clubhouse lead at −5. In the round Faldo made eight birdies and just one bogey at the 11th hole. Mike Reid chipped in for birdie on the 12th hole to take sole possession of the lead for the first time in the tournament at −6. However, Reid missed a short putt for par on 14 and double-bogeyed 15 after hitting his approach into the water to fade to 6th place. Seve Ballesteros, who held the lead earlier in the day, was just one shot back on 16, but underhit his tee-shot into the water ending any chances of his third Masters title. Greg Norman stormed into contention with birdies on 9, 10, 13, 15, 16 and 17 to tie for the lead. Norman however was unable to get up and down from the front of the green on 18, making bogey and missing a playoff by one shot.

In the end it came down to the final pairing of Ben Crenshaw and Scott Hoch. Hoch birdied the 15th to take sole possession of the lead at −6, but missed a short par putt at 17 to drop back to −5. Crenshaw, three back of the lead after the 15th hole, birdied 16 and 17 to share the lead with Hoch heading to the final hole. Both players hit the fairway off the tee, and then Hoch hit his approach on the green after Crenshaw missed in the front greenside bunker. Hoch barely missed his birdie putt and was able to tap in for par, tying Faldo for the clubhouse lead. Crenshaw then had 12 feet to join a playoff with Faldo and Hoch, but missed.

Final leaderboard

Sources:

Scorecard

Cumulative tournament scores, relative to par
{|class="wikitable" span = 50 style="font-size:85%;
|-
|style="background: Pink;" width=10|
|Birdie
|style="background: PaleGreen;" width=10|
|Bogey
|style="background: Green;" width=10|
|Double bogey
|}
Source:

Playoff
Faldo and Hoch were in the tenth playoff in Masters history and the fourth to use the sudden death format. The playoff began at the 10th hole, where both had made par every day. Both hit the fairway, but Faldo pushed his approach in the short right side bunker. Hoch then played safely, hitting the front middle of the green, leaving an uphill birdie putt. Hoch lagged his putt up to 2 feet, forcing Faldo to make his 15 footer for par. Faldo missed, but made his 4-foot comebacker for a bogey five. Hoch then had his third putt of the day to win the championship, but missed, then made the 4-foot comebacker for bogey to extend the playoff.

The playoff went to the 11th hole, which Faldo had bogeyed in all four rounds. After Faldo hit his approach to 25 feet, Hoch pushed his approach right of the green. Hoch chipped to six feet, but Faldo made his long birdie putt for his second major championship and first Masters title.

References

External links
Masters.com – Past winners and results
Augusta.com – 1989 Masters leaderboard and scorecards
You Tube.com– video – 1989 Masters, final round 

1989
1989 in golf
1989 in American sports
1989 in sports in Georgia (U.S. state)
April 1989 sports events in the United States